Jakub Bursa (21 July 1813 in Dolní Nekvasovice – 19 August 1884 in Vlachovo Březí) was a Czech architect, folk artist and builder of Bohemian Rustic Baroque architecture. He decorated many gables of houses in Southern Bohemia in the style of the so-called rural South Bohemian Baroque.

Czech architects
1813 births
1884 deaths
19th-century Czech architects
People from Prachatice District